In the theory of dynamical systems (or turbulent flow), the Pomeau–Manneville scenario is the transition to chaos (turbulence) due to intermittency. Named after Yves Pomeau and Paul Manneville.

References

Dynamical systems
Chaos theory
Turbulence